1951 in philosophy

Events

Publications 
 Theodor W. Adorno, Minima Moralia
 Hannah Arendt, The Origins of Totalitarianism
 Kenneth Arrow, Social Choice and Individual Values, popularizing social choice theory and Arrow's impossibility theorem
 Albert Camus, The Rebel (L'Homme révolté)
 Eric Hoffer, The True Believer
 Karl Huber (executed 1943), Leibniz
 Marshall McLuhan, The Mechanical Bride: Folklore of Industrial Man
 Hans Reichenbach, The Rise of Scientific Philosophy
 Willard Van Orman Quine, "Two Dogmas of Empiricism," The Philosophical Review

Births 
 January 1 - Luc Ferry 
 January 14 - Jonathan Westphal 
 June 2 - François Jullien

Deaths 
 January 5 - Andrei Platonov (born 1899)
 January 7 - René Guénon (born 1886)
 April 4 - Sadegh Hedayat (born 1903)
 April 29 - Ludwig Wittgenstein (born 1889)

References 

Philosophy
20th-century philosophy
Philosophy by year